Ccullco is a populated place in Apurímac Region, Peru.

See also
Abancay
Chuquibambilla
Tambobamba

References

Populated places in the Apurímac Region